SAT-3/WASC or South Atlantic 3/West Africa Submarine Cable is a submarine communications cable linking Portugal and Spain to South Africa, with connections to several West African countries along the route. It forms part of the SAT-3/WASC/SAFE cable system, where the SAFE cable links South Africa to Asia. The SAT-3/WASC/SAFE system provides a path between Asia and Europe for telecommunications traffic that is an alternative to the cable routes that pass through the Middle East, such as SEA-ME-WE 3 and FLAG. SAT-3 has a capacity of 340 Gbit/s while SAFE has a capacity of 440 Gbit/s. The SAT-3 system together with SAFE was built by a consortium of operators . As of 2006, major investors included Telkom Group (about 13%),  France Telecom (12.08%), Nitel (8.39%); TCI, a subsidiary of AT&T Inc. (12.42%); and VSNL (8.93%).

Bandwidth costs
Prices for SAT-3 bandwidth in the African countries it serves are high (US$4,500–12,000 per Mbit/s per month, over 50 times greater than bandwidth prices in the U.S.) in large part because operators have monopoly control of access. The lowest rates occur in Ghana, where the Ghana Internet Service Providers Association (GISPA) organized a two-year negotiation with a court fight against Ghana Telecom.  SEACOM president Brian Herlihy states that the owners of the SAT-3 cable have cut prices by 50% since the 2007 announcement of Seacom, in order to compete with the arrival of Seacom in East Africa.

Landing points

The SAT-3 has landing points in European countries:

 Sesimbra, Portugal
 Chipiona, Spain (though this landing is considered to be part of the Telefónica domestic network)
 Alta Vista in Las Palmas, Canary Islands

and in Africa:

 Dakar, Senegal
 Abidjan, Côte d'Ivoire
 Accra, Ghana
 Cotonou, Benin
 Lagos, Lagos, Nigeria
 Douala, Cameroon
 Libreville, Gabon
 Cacuaco, Angola
 Melkbosstrand, South Africa meeting SAFE

Although Telecom Namibia holds ownership in SAT-3/WASC, Namibia has no landing point. Namibian internet users currently have no access to SAT-3/WASC, because Telecom Namibia would have to purchase capacity from Telkom SA, and due to Telkom SA's high prices has so far refused to do so.

Technology
The cable itself consists of four fibers, using Erbium-doped fiber amplifier repeaters and wavelength division multiplexing.

History
SAT-3/WASC/SAFE began operations in 2001, providing the first links to Europe for West African internet users and, for South Africans, taking up service from SAT-2 which was reaching maximum capacity. SAT-2 had been brought into service in the early 1990s as a replacement for the original undersea cable SAT-1 which was constructed in the 1960s.

In November 2007, no internet access was available through SAT-3 for about seven days in parts of central Africa. A government official from Cameroon blamed a technical failure at the underwater SAT-3 high sea fibre optic terminal, about forty kilometres from Douala. Many ISPs in Cameroon had transitioned their connections from independent satellite connections to SAT-3 in mid-2007 creating serious communication difficulties during the seven days.

In late July 2009, SAT-3 cable damage caused internet blackouts in multiple west African countries including Benin, Togo, Niger, and Nigeria. Togo and Niger were "completely offline" and Benin was able to "reroute its net traffic through neighboring countries." However, the three nations were able to use alternative satellite links in order to maintain some Internet communication with the rest of the world. Nigeria suffered a 70% loss of bandwidth that caused problems in banking, government and other mobile networks. President of the Nigeria Internet Group, Lanre Ajayi, said, "[the cable is] a critical national resource because of its importance to the economy and to security." Two weeks may pass before the cable is fixed.

See also 
 List of international submarine communications cables
Individual cable systems off the coast of Africa include:
 Atlantis-2 Argentina linked to Portugal
 EASSy East Africa Cable linking South Africa and East African nations.
 LION
 Main One Portugal linked to West Africa
 SAT-2 Portugal linked to South Africa
 SEACOM East coast of Africa
 GLO-1 Nigeria to the UK
 ACE South Africa linked to France
 WACS South Africa linked to the United Kingdom

References

External links
 Official SAT-3/WASC/SAFE Homepage
 The Sat3 Fibre - a Monopoly That Stands in the Way of Cheaper International Bandwidth
 What Must Happen when SAT3’s Monopoly Comes to an End? (CIPACO)

Submarine communications cables in the North Atlantic Ocean
Submarine communications cables in the South Atlantic Ocean
Internet in Africa
2001 establishments in Africa
2001 establishments in Europe